|language = English
}}

Stephen Katz (4 July 1946 – 18 October 2005) was an American teacher and screenwriter. Katz wrote several television episodes and three feature-length films during his career. Following a move to Plano, Texas in 1993, Katz taught a communications class at Plano East Senior High School until his death in 2005. He died of prostate cancer and was survived by his wife and two children.

Filmography 
 The Contract (2006), writer
 Satan's Princess (1990), writer
 L.A. Law (1986), writer, episodes "New Kidney on the Block" and "God Rest Ye Little Gentleman"
 Hunter (1984), writer, episode "The Biggest Man in Town", story editor, episode "Night of the Dragons"
 The A-Team (1983), writer
 Knight Rider (1982), writer
 Hex (1973), writer

References

External links 
 
 Mr. Katz memorial web site by Jonny Carroll

1946 births
2005 deaths
Deaths from prostate cancer
American television writers
American male screenwriters
People from Plano, Texas
Deaths from cancer in Texas
Screenwriters from Texas
American male television writers
20th-century American male writers
20th-century American screenwriters